ZWE is the ISO 3166-1 alpha-3 code for Zimbabwe, a country in Africa.

ZWE may also refer to:
 The IATA code for Antwerpen-Centraal railway station